Thrunton Wood is an area of woodland and open moor in Northumberland. It is popular with walkers, mountain bikers and horse riders, and home to two waymarked walking trails. There is an Iron Age fort on Castle Hill, and Thrunton Wood is home to several caves, including Macartney's Cave, once home to a local monk, and Thomas Wedderburn's Hole, where a local highwayman reputedly once hid from the law.

References

Forests and woodlands of Northumberland